Kazuhiro is a masculine Japanese given name. Notable people with the name include:

, Japanese manga artist
, Japanese anime director and supervisor
, professional mixed martial arts (MMA) fighter
, Japanese politician of the Democratic Party of Japan
, Japanese mixed martial artist
, Japanese football player
, former sumo wrestler from Makizono, Kagoshima, Japan
Kazuhiro Kiuchi (born 1960), Japanese manga artist and film director
, former professional baseball player in Japan
, Japanese snowboarder
, Japanese skeleton racer who has competed since 1991
Kotoshōgiku Kazuhiro (born 1984), sumo wrestler
, Japanese long-distance runner
, Japanese javelin thrower 
, Japanese football player
, Japanese cyclist
, Japanese football player
, Japanese former football player
, Japanese MMA fighter known for his antics inside and outside of the ring
Kazuhiro Nakata (born 1958), Japanese voice actor
, Japanese marine scientist and ichthyologist
, retired judoka
, Japanese shogi player
, Japanese film director, screenwriter and actor
, retired relief pitcher
, Japanese speed skater
, Japanese footballer
, Japanese football player
, Japanese sledge hockey player
, Japanese sport wrestler
, Japanese baseball player
, Japanese modern pentathlete
, Japanese professional drifting driver
, Japanese baseball player
, Japanese actor and voice actor affiliated with the Seinenza Theater Company
, Japanese baseball player and manager
, Japanese table tennis player

See also
Kazu Hiro (born 1969), American prosthetic makeup artist

Japanese masculine given names